Madhupur College is a university college located in Madhupur Upazila, Tangail, Dhaka, Bangladesh established in 1972. It offers Higher Secondary Level (HSC), degree level and provides some honours level courses. The college is affiliated with the National University and Board of Intermediate and Secondary Education, Dhaka.

Location
The college is situated by the side of Tangail-Mymensingh highway.

See also
Alokdia High School
Madhupur Shahid Smrity Higher Secondary School
Madhupur Rani Bhabani High School

References

External links

Education in Madhupur
Colleges in Tangail District
Education in Tangail